Bruce Randall Donald (born 1958) is an American computer scientist and computational biologist. He is the James B. Duke Professor of Computer Science and Biochemistry at Duke University. He has made numerous contributions to several fields in Computer Science such as robotics, Microelectromechanical Systems (MEMS), Geometric & physical algorithms and computational geometry; as well as in areas of Structural Molecular Biology & Biochemistry such as Protein design, Protein Structure Determination and Computational Chemistry.

Biography
Donald received a B.A. summa cum laude in Russian Language and Literature from Yale University in 1980. After working at the Laboratory for Computer Graphics and Spatial Analysis in the Graduate School of Design at Harvard University, he then attended MIT EECS, where he received his S.M. in EECS (1984) and Ph.D. in Computer Science (1987) under the supervision of professor Tomás Lozano-Pérez in the MIT AI Lab (Artificial Intelligence Laboratory). He joined the Cornell University Department of Computer Science as an assistant professor in 1987.

At Cornell, Donald received tenure in 1993, and served as associate professor of computer science at Cornell University until 1998.  While on sabbatical at Stanford University (1994-1996), he worked at Paul Allen's R&D and technology incubator Interval Research Corporation (1995-1997), where he and Tom Ngo co-invented Embedded Constraint Graphics. After moving to Dartmouth, Donald was the Joan P. and Edward J. Foley Jr 1933 Professor of Computer Science, Dartmouth College until 2006 when he moved to Duke University. Currently Donald is the James B. Duke Professor of Computer Science, Chemistry, and Biochemistry, in the Trinity College of Arts and Sciences at Duke University and in the School of Medicine, Duke University Medical Center. Donald was appointed William and Sue Gross Professor from 2006 to 2012, and was named James B. Duke Professor in 2012.

He is a fellow of the Association for Computing Machinery (ACM) and a fellow of the IEEE. Previously, he was a Guggenheim Fellow (2001–2002) and received a National Science Foundation Presidential Young Investigator Award (1989–1994). In 2015, Donald was elected a fellow of the American Association for the Advancement of Science (AAAS), for contributions to computational molecular biology.

Work
Donald’s early research was in the field of robotic motion planning and distributed manipulation. Later he has made numerous contributions to MEMS and Micro-robotics, and designed MEMS micro-robots with dimensions of 60 µm by 250 µm by 10 µm.

Recently, he has conducted research in the areas of Structural Molecular Biology; chiefly, Protein Design and Protein Structure Determination from NMR data. He has developed numerous algorithms for protein design which have been successfully tested experimentally in the wet lab.  The protein design algorithms attempt to incorporate additional molecular flexibility into the design process by using ensembles and continuously flexible rotamers and backbones. Donald has also developed algorithms for determining the structures of biomedically significant proteins. For example, his subgroup algorithm CRANS (Acta Crystallogr. D 2004; J. Biol. Chem. 2003), which identifies cross-rotation peaks consistent with non-crystallographic symmetry, was used in the structure determination of the enzyme dihydrofolate reductase-thymidylate synthase (DHFR-TS) from Cryptosporidium hominis, an important advancement in Cryptosporidium biology. He has designed many algorithms and computational protocols to extract structural information from NMR data, and used that information to compute structures of globular proteins and symmetric homo-oligomers. A distinct feature of his algorithms is that they use less data, and provide complexity-theoretic guarantees on time and space (See, e.g., B. R. Donald and J. Martin. "Automated NMR Assignment and Protein Structure Determination using Sparse Dipolar Coupling Constraints." Progress in NMR Spectroscopy 2009; 55(2):101-127). Donald is the author of Algorithms in Structural Molecular BiologyAlgorithms in Structural Molecular Biology, a textbook published by MIT Press (2011).

Students
Donald has supervised many students and postdocs, many of whom are now professors in reputed universities such as MIT, Carnegie-Mellon University, University of Washington, Seattle, University of Massachusetts Amherst, Dartmouth College, Duke University, Middlebury College and University of Toronto; and some are researchers in prestigious research organizations viz.  NIAID, NIST, IBM, Sandia National Laboratories.

Personal life

Donald is the son of historian David Herbert Donald and historian and editor Aida DiPace Donald.

See also
 MEMS
 Protein design
 NMR
 Protein Structure
 Kinodynamic planning

Publications
Donald is the author of over 100 publications. A representative selection:
 Kinodynamic Motion Planning. Bruce Randall Donald, Patrick G. Xavier, John F. Canny, John H. Reif. J. ACM 40(5): 1048-1066 (1993).
 Phylogenetic classification of protozoa based on the structure of the linker domain in the bifunctional enzyme, dihydrofolate  reductase-thymidylate synthase. Robert H. O’Neil, Ryan H. Lilien, Bruce R. Donald, Robert M. Stroud and Amy C. Anderson. J Biol Chem 2003. 278(52):52980-7.

References

External links
 Bruce Donald's homepage
 Bruce Donald's Research
 ACM Fellows Award: Bruce Donald
 DBLP: Bruce Randall Donald
 MEDLINE: Bruce Donald

1958 births
Living people
American computer scientists
Duke University faculty
Yale University alumni
MIT School of Engineering alumni
Fellows of the Association for Computing Machinery
Cornell University faculty
Computational chemists
Place of birth missing (living people)